"Brothers" is a song by American rapper Lil Tjay, released on July 9, 2018. It amassed millions of streams on SoundCloud, becoming his breakout hit and leading to him signing with Columbia Records. The song appears on his debut studio album True 2 Myself (2019), which also features the official remix of the song featuring American rapper Lil Durk.

Composition
The song finds Lil Tjay sing-rapping about his earlier life and experience, including growing up on the streets and grave subjects such as death and being incarcerated ("Caught a felony, judge tried to slave me / Lost my grandmother, R.I.P. Mavy").

Charts

Certifications

References

2018 singles
2018 songs
Columbia Records singles
Lil Tjay songs
Sony Music singles
Songs written by Lil Tjay